The Weibel M/1932 was a light machine gun concept of Danish origin and was considered to supplement the Madsen gun in Danish service. It was fed from a 20-round box magazine chambered in the intermediate 7x44mm round.  This calibre was considered underpowered for its day but shares the same ballistics as later calibres such as the 7.92×33mm Kurz, 7.62×45mm vz. 52 and 7.62×39mm M43 used in assault rifles.

References
Weibel M/1932 type 1
Weibel M/1932 type 2

Light machine guns
Machine guns of Denmark
World War II machine guns